Cereopsius vittipennis is a species of beetle in the family Cerambycidae. It was described by Warren Samuel Fisher based on specimen(s) from Mount Kinabalu in 1935, originally under the genus Epepeotes. It is known from Borneo.

References

Cereopsius
Beetles described in 1935
Beetles of Asia
Insects of Borneo
Insects of Malaysia